The Amasa Farrier Boardinghouse is a historic house at 280 Main Street in Stoneham, Massachusetts.  The large wood-frame house was built c. 1865 by Amasa Farrier, the town surveyor.  The building served as a boarding house for workers in Stoneham's shoe factories, and is the only boarding house of the period to survive in the town.  It is a -story wood-frame structure with modest Italianate styling, including bracketed eaves and gable, and broad corner boards.  A period porch with bracketed turned posts has been replaced by an enclosed porch.

The house was listed on the National Register of Historic Places in 1984.

See also
Amasa Farrier House, Farrier's own residence
National Register of Historic Places listings in Stoneham, Massachusetts
National Register of Historic Places listings in Middlesex County, Massachusetts

References

National Register of Historic Places in Stoneham, Massachusetts
Italianate architecture in Massachusetts
Houses completed in 1865
Residential buildings on the National Register of Historic Places in Massachusetts